Msanzala is a constituency of the National Assembly of Zambia. It covers Chasya, Chimuka and Kasuwa in the Lusangazi District of Eastern Province.

List of MPs

References

Constituencies of the National Assembly of Zambia
1983 establishments in Zambia
Constituencies established in 1983